A Vision in Blakelight is an album by John Zorn recorded in New York City in December 2011 and released on the Tzadik label in 2012. The album is inspired by the works of William Blake.

Reception

Martin Schray stated "The album is a wonderfully varied suite reflecting Blake’s vision and eventually one of his most famous quotations (“if the doors of perception were cleansed, everything would appear to man as it is, infinite“) is turned into music by the works of John Zorn".

Track listing 
All compositions by John Zorn except as indicated
 "When the Morning Stars Sang Together" - 5:28   
 "The Hammer of Los" - 3:58   
 "Jerusalem" - 5:15   
 "Prophecy" - 3:10   
 "And He Rode Upon the Cherubim" - 5:09   
 "Marriage of Heaven and Hell" - 4:18   
 "Woman Clothed with the Sun" - 5:20   
 "Shadows in Ancient Time" (Zorn, William Blake) – 5:40   
 "Island in the Moon" - 7:06   
 "Night Thoughts" - 4:55

Personnel 
John Medeski - piano, organ 
Kenny Wollesen - vibraphone, bells 
Carol Emanuel - harp 
Trevor Dunn - bass 
Joey Baron - drums 
Cyro Baptista - percussion 
Jack Huston - narration

References 

2012 albums
Albums produced by John Zorn
Tzadik Records albums
John Zorn albums
Adaptations of works by William Blake